Wal Fall (born 8 September 1992) is a German footballer.

Personal
Fall is a cousin of USMNT player Jermaine Jones. Saint Louis FC folded following the 2020 USL Championship season.

References

External links
 
 

1992 births
Living people
German footballers
German people of Senegalese descent
SV Wehen Wiesbaden players
1. FC Nürnberg II players
SV Waldhof Mannheim players
SC Austria Lustenau players
3. Liga players
Rochester New York FC players
USL Championship players
Saint Louis FC players
Oakland Roots SC players
Association football midfielders
Footballers from Frankfurt